Shani Abeysekara is a former Sri Lankan police officer and former director of Criminal Investigation Department. He was leading in investigations into numerous high-profile cases of human rights abuses such as the disappearance of Prageeth Eknaligoda and assault on Lasantha Wickrematunge. He was also accused of several other allegations including his involvement in giving pressure to the current Sri Lankan government led by President Gotabaya Rajapaksa. In January 2020, he was suspended from the Service of Sri Lanka Police after his leaked telephone conversations with Ranjan Ramanayake which was termed as a discredit to the police services of the country. On 25 November 2020, he was tested positive for COVID-19 and was transferred to a different prison. On 16 June 2021, he was granted bail by the Court of Appeal after spending jail term for nearly one year.

Controversies 
His telephone conversations with politician Ranjan Ramanayake and some high-profile figures including judges were leaked in the media. Other several telephone conversations involving him were also leaked to the public and the recordings suggested that he used the law in unlawful manner to favour Ranjan Ramanayake's request. Several audio recordings were found during a raid at his house and was also accused of causing disruption to police investigations during the raid.

Shani Abeysekara was also blamed for the escape of Nishantha de Silva with his family in order to seek asylum following the conclusion of the 2019 Sri Lankan presidential election where Gotabaya Rajapaksa emerged victorious.

In November 2019, Shani Abeysekara's name was also mentioned in a mafia to tarnish the image of SLPP formed government in a scenario related to the abduction of a Sri Lankan Swiss embassy staff member who claimed that she was investigated nearly for one hour. She was released on the same day after two hours of inquiry. The Swiss government immediately requested the Sri Lankan authorities to conduct inquiry regarding the probe. The local embassy employee was dragged into a car by a gang of unknown men to obtain information related to the Swiss embassy and information about Silva.
 
Investigations on mobile phones found that she was in contact with the former CID Director Shani Abeysekara, former Lake House Chairman Krishantha Cooray and Darisha Bastian, the former Editor in Chief of the Sunday Observer days before she claimed to have been abducted. Krishantha Cooray traveled to Malaysia in December as investigation happened while Dharisha Bastian travelled to Switzerland before the "abduction".

On 31 July 2020, he was arrested by the Colombo Crime Division for allegations regarding fabricating false evidence with regard to a court case against former police officer Vass Gunawardane in connection with the murder of businessman Mohammed Siyam in 2013. He was remanded until 7 August 2020. However, he was further remanded up until October 2020. In December 2020, Shani filed petition against his arrest at the Gall High Court but his plea was rejected.

References 

Living people
Prisoners and detainees of Sri Lanka
Sinhalese police officers
Sri Lankan prisoners and detainees
Year of birth missing (living people)